is the sixth studio album by the Japanese rock band Asian Kung-Fu Generation, released on June 23, 2010. It was announced in April 2010 after Gotoh posted an entry into his diary stating the title and that it would be released on June 23, 2010.

History
This is the first album released in 19 months since Surf Bungaku Kamakura. In his own diary, Gotoh was flying to reveal the announcement of the album. But, although the album title and track listing were announced, announcement of the release date was postponed until it was declared by a local DJ on the radio. Before the album was released, a special website was created, also called "Magic Disk". The band also spent some time during February in New York City, recording two songs, "Rising Sun" and "Yes", at Stratosphere Sound. Video of their recordings can be seen on the DVD released with the Limited Edition of Magic Disk.

Some of the music on the album is considerably different from their past albums; such as the inclusion of brass, string, and percussion instruments, along with synthesizers as well. Gotoh has been quoted as saying, "This album is a great personal history, I think it's monumental!"

Track listing
The track listing was announced in Gotoh's diary on 18 April 2010, with Solanin included as an "extra track".

Personnel
Masafumi Gotō – lead vocals, guitar, lyrics
Kensuke Kita – lead guitar, background vocals
Takahiro Yamada –  bass, background vocals
Kiyoshi Ijichi – drums
Asian Kung-Fu Generation – producer
Yusuke Nakamura – cover art

References 

Asian Kung-Fu Generation albums
2010 albums
Japanese-language albums
Sony Music albums